Strikeouts For Troops is a national non-profit founded in 2005 by Barry Zito to help injured US Troops and their families by providing 'the comforts of home' as they undergo treatment for injuries. Zito started the program after visiting a military hospital as a way to lift spirits and improve morale.

The program is supported by over 100 MLB players, coaches, managers, athletes from other sports, corporate sponsors, and fans. Participating MLB pitchers donate a certain amount of money depending on how many strikeouts they record in each season. Other players similarly donate varying amounts for achieving certain on-field goals.

References

External links

United States military support organizations